Cotter is a city in Baxter County, Arkansas, United States. The population was 970 at the 2010 census.

History

Native American Bluff Dwellers were the original inhabitants of the area now known as Cotter. When Native Americans were moved westward on the Trail of Tears, approximately 1000 Cherokees crossed just a short distance upriver from the current location of Downtown Cotter.

Exploration and settlement
In 1819, Henry Schoolcraft was exploring the Ozarks and spent a night in the Cotter area. He said of the area,
 White River is one of the most beautiful and enchanting streams, and by far the most transparent, which discharge their waters into the Mississippi ... We here behold the assembled tributaries flowing in a smooth, broad. deep, and majestic current ... skirted at a short distance by mountains of the most imposing grandeur.... [The] extreme limpidity and want of colour ... was early seized upon by the French traders on first visiting this stream, in calling it "La Rivière Blanche" (White River).

Future president, Herbert Hoover, spent the summer of 1892 helping Geologist John C. Branner survey the northern Ozarks. By the early 1900s, there were many mining companies active in both Baxter and Marion Counties. Cotter quickly became a central point where minerals could be shipped via steamboat to much larger cities in central Arkansas or southern Missouri.

Originally, the river bend was known as either Lake's Ferry or Lake's Landing. At this spot, the White River turns sharply, making a convenient border for a town. The spring that rises up from the caves beneath Cotter, also added to the appeal to early settlers. Lake's Ferry was known as one of the most beautiful spots on the river and was appreciated by locals and tourists.

White River Line
Seeking to capitalize on the growing trade in the area, the Missouri-Pacific Railroad announced plans to open the White River Line which would run through the area and would connect with the main line in Lake's Landing. By 1902, the Cotter post office had opened. Two years later, the first school in Cotter opened. In 1905, the Missouri Pacific Railroad bought the area and sold over one thousand lots, mostly to railroad employees. The city was incorporated in 1905 as Cotter, Arkansas. By that time, the population was over 600. The town was named after William Cotter, an official for the Missouri Pacific Railway System. The materials required to build the town and railroad had to be brought in by steamboats down the White River. Once the railroad was completed, the use of steamboats on the rivers of Arkansas decreased and eventually ceased altogether. In 1906, the first passenger train arrived, and the tourist era began.

Expulsion of African Americans
The construction of the railroad brought many laborers, including African Americans, to the area. However, once the work was completed the sentiment among white residents turned against them. The anti-Black attitude was encouraged by a visit from Arkansas Governor Jeff Davis, who gave a racist speech in Cotter in 1904, and by the local newspaper, the Cotter Courier. In April 1906 the Courier ran an editorial titled "Too Many Negroes", which said that local residents had a "feeling...that the negroes should move on." In and around August 1906, all of Cotter's African Americans were run out of town, except for one family of three, the Masons. In the 1950s advertisements for Cotter boasted that it was "100 per cent white", and the 1960 census recorded no African American residents.

Cotter Bridge

An inconvenient ferry system made the need for a bridge apparent. Locals wanted a bridge, but they strongly opposed a toll bridge. Arkansas did not have a central highway body at the time, and was instead a patchwork of "road districts", which made the bridge-building efforts even more difficult. Without a toll, funding wasn't available until Arkansas Highway 12 was redesignated U.S. Route 62 in 1930. The Cotter Bridge was constructed through the area using a unique rainbow arch design.

Geography
Cotter is located at  (36.274772, -92.528336).

Demographics

2020 census

As of the 2020 United States census, there were 886 people, 419 households, and 271 families residing in the city.

2010 census
As of the census of 2010, there were 1,078 people, 472 households and 293 families residing in the city. The racial makeup of the city was 97.07% White, 0.87% Native American, 0.22% Asian, and 1.85% from two or more races.  1.52% of the population were Hispanic or Latino of any race.

There were 545 households, out of which 20.8% had children under the age of 18 living with them, 48.5% were married couples living together, 8.6% had a female householder with no husband present, and 40.0% were non-families. 35.4% of all households were made up of individuals, and 16.7% had someone living alone who was 65 years of age or older.  The average household size was 2.08 and the average family size was 2.67.

In the city, the population was spread out, with 19.7% under the age of 18, 8.7% from 18 to 24, 24.8% from 25 to 44, 26.7% from 45 to 64, and 20.2% who were 65 years of age or older.  The median age was 43 years. For every 100 females, there were 97.2 males.  For every 100 females age 18 and over, there were 99.5 males.

The median income for a household in the city was $22,857, and the median income for a family was $34,375. Males had a median income of $26,298 versus $17,266 for females. The per capita income for the city was $15,893.  About 11.9% of families and 16.8% of the population were below the poverty line, including 18.3% of those under age 18 and 13.3% of those age 65 or over.

Education 
Formal education in Cotter began with Miss Cora Patterson teaching 40 students under a tent on January 4, 1904. In 1915, Cotter schools merged with the East Cotter School District, with the Gassville and Whiteville districts merging into Cotter in 1948.

Today, public education is provided by the Cotter School District including Cotter High School (grades 7 through 12) and Amanda Gist Elementary School (kindergarten through grade 6).

Media

Cotter and Baxter County are within the Springfield, Missouri TV market.

The city has been home to five newspapers over the years, the longest lasting being the Cotter Courier (1903-c. 1918) and The Cotter Record (1911-1937). Publications lasting only a year or so include The White River Headlight, The Screech Owl, and the Bull Shoals Gazette. Today, Cotter news is covered by The Baxter Bulletin.

Infrastructure

List of highways 
 US 62/US 412
 U.S. Route 62 Business
 Arkansas Highway 345

Railroads 
Cotter has one local railroad, the Missouri and Northern Arkansas Railroad. The MNA leases the track from Newport to Kansas City, Missouri, from the Union Pacific. The regular train traffic are empty coal trains from The Independence power plant, as well as a north and south local out of Cotter. Additionally, there is a small railyard and crew change point

Airports 
Cotter is accessible to two separate commercial airports, Ozark Regional Airport (Baxter County) and Flippin Municipal Airport 
(Marion County). There is also a rural air field, Valley Airport, located on Denton Ferry Road that serves small planes owned by residents.

External links
 Map of Cotter (US Census Bureau)
 Map of Baxter County (US Census Bureau)
 Baxter County Historical and Genealogical Society

References

Cities in Baxter County, Arkansas
Cities in Arkansas
Populated places established in 1905
1905 establishments in Arkansas